The French tanker Somme is a  command and replenishment tanker (BCR) of the French Navy. In addition to its primary duty as a fleet tanker, Somme is configured as a flagship and has served as such in the Indian Ocean. The vessel was constructed at La Seyne, France beginning in 1985 and entered service in 1990. In October 2009, the ship was mistakenly attacked by pirates off the coast of Somalia. The attack was repelled and the pirates captured.

Design and description
In French service, the final three  tankers are called Bâtiment de commandement et ravitailleur (BCR, "command and replenishment ship"). In addition to their role as a fleet tanker, the three ships dubbed BCR can accommodate an entire general staff and thus supervise naval operations as a command ship. The BCRs have one crane positioned along the centreline.

Somme has two dual solid/liquid underway transfer stations per side and can replenish two ships per side and one astern. These numbers change with the needs of the fleet.

The Durance-class tankers all mount a flight deck over the stern and a hangar. The ships utilise Aérospatiale Alouette III and Westland Lynx helicopters but are capable of operating larger ones from their flight deck. For defence, Somme initially mounted one Bofors 40 mm/L60 anti-aircraft (AA) gun in a single gun turret and two  AA guns in a twin turret. The ship is equipped with two DRBN 34 navigational radars. The armament was later altered by removing the 20 mm guns and adding four  M2 Browning machine guns and three launchers for Simbad Mistral surface-to-air missiles. The ship has a complement of 162 and is capable of accommodating 250 personnel.

Construction and career

The fifth and final tanker of the Durance class was ordered in March 1984 as part of the 1984–1988 plan. The vessel was laid down on 3 May 1985 by Normed at their yard in La Seyne, France. Named for a river in France, the ship was launched on 3 October 1987 and given the pennant number A 631. Somme was commissioned into the French Navy on 7 March 1990.  The Durance-class ships were assigned to the Force d'action navale (FAR, "Naval Action Force") after entering service. One of the BCRs is assigned to Indian Ocean as flagship of the French naval forces in the region. The ship is home ported in Brest, France.

In April 2008, the commander of ALINDIEN, the French command in the Indian Ocean, commanded the strike from Somme that freed the yacht  from Somali pirates. Somme repelled the assault rifle attack without sustaining damage or casualties and captured five of the pirates.

At the end of 2018, Somme underwent a refit at Brest, returning to service on 5 June 2019. In October 2019, Somme was deployed as part of Operation Corymbe, the French naval mission to the Gulf of Guinea, marking the first time a command ship was deployed there. During the deployment, Somme participated in the African naval exercise Grand African Nemo with 18 African nations.

As of late 2021, of the original five Durance-class ships in the French Navy, only Somme and her sister ship Marne remained in service. The last two ships were expected to be replaced by the new Jacques Chevallier-class vessels and retire between 2022 and 2025. In 2022 it was indicated that Somme would continue in service until 2027 when she is planned to be replaced by the third of the Jacques Chevallier-class support ships, Émile Bertin.

Citations

References

External links

 
 

1987 ships
Durance-class tankers
Ships built in France
Maritime incidents in 2009
France–Somalia relations